Final Challenge is an adventure for fantasy role-playing games published by Mayfair Games in 1984.

Plot summary
Final Challenge is a solo scenario.  Years ago, fighter Tel El'ryn foolishly helped his friend Gwdion start on the road to black magic.  Now Gwdion has returned as a powerful evil wizard, and it is up to El'ryn to stop him before he brings the whole land under his power.

In Final Challenge, the player character is Tel El'Ryn, a better-than-average fighter on the trail of the mysterious Guidon and his Tower of Madness. The character's statistics are pre-generated, but the player can select four magic items that will help the character the most.  From there, the game uses a numbered paragraph system to direct the player from event to event based on the player's decisions at various encounters.

Publication history
Final Challenge was written by Matthew J. Costello, with a cover by Tom Kidd, and was published by Mayfair Games in 1984 as a 32-page book. The adventure module was part of the Role Aids line.

Reception
Rick Swan reviewed the adventure in The Space Gamer No. 76. He commented on the adventure's format: "Any solitaire module without a magic ink pen or a cellophane mystery views is already a step ahead in my book.  Don't get me wrong – I like a good gimmick as much as the next guy, but a strong story is worth a hundred magic pens.  This is no news to Matt Costello, who's put together a clever plot, a colorful cast of characters, and an engagingly tricky puzzle to come up with one of the best solitaire modules in a long time." Swan stated: "Even without a referee, the design of Final Challenge is remarkably rich, complete with a simple but effective combat system and a hex-grid wilderness map that randomly generates its own encounters.  In fact, Final Challenge has more in common with the old Barbarian Prince boardgame than it does with most solitaire modules (and that's a compliment, because Barbarian Prince was one terrific game)." He commented on the limitations of solo adventures: "The most frequent problem with solitaire modules is their limited play value, and it's a problem shared by Final Challenge.  I got through the whole thing in about an hour and a half, although I admit that I stumbled into the key hexes by sheer dumb luck.  Replay value is non-existent – when the mystery is solved, that's it.  A system of alternate plots would be nice, but that'll give something for Mr. Costello to work on next time." Swan concluded by review by stating, "Kids who gobble up those 'endless adventure' interactive paperbacks ought to shake an extra couple of dollars from their piggy banks and try a copy of Final Challenge.  Solitaire fans could easily get spoiled by modules as good as this."

Reviews
 Game News #10 (Dec., 1985)

References

Fantasy role-playing game adventures
Role Aids
Role-playing game supplements introduced in 1984